Solomon Makafan Alabi (born March 21, 1988) is a Nigerian former professional basketball player. He attended Florida State University where he helped them to a third-place finish in the ACC standings and a trip to the NCAA Tournament where they fell to Gonzaga in the first round. The 7-foot-1 Alabi was a two-time ACC All-Defensive team selection in both his freshman and sophomore years. He played soccer before taking up basketball at age 15.

Early life
Alabi grew up in Zaria, Kaduna state of Nigeria before moving to Clermont, Florida at the age of 17. He attended high school at Montverde Academy in Montverde, Florida where he was coached by Kevin Sutton.  Alabi was an all-state performer and helped lead Montverde Academy to a perfect 30–0 record during his senior season. He attended the same high school as NBA player Luc Mbah a Moute. Alabi started for the Nigerian Junior National Team at the 2007 Nike All-American camp. He also helped Nigeria qualify for the 2007 FIBA Under-19 World Championship. He was selected for the 2007 Nike Hoop Summit, representing the World Select Team, where he led all players in blocked shots.

College career
After breaking his leg 10 games into his freshman year, Alabi had to take a medical redshirt. As a redshirt freshman, he earned All-ACC Freshman Team honors by averaging 8.4 points per game and leading the ACC in blocks with 2.1 per game. For his great shot-blocking ability, he was named to the ACC All-Defensive team in 2008–2009.

As a redshirt sophomore, Alabi ranked 26th in the nation in blocked shots with an average of 2.39 while increasing his scoring average to 11.7 points per game. On April 23, 2010, he declared himself eligible for the 2010 NBA draft.

Professional career
On June 24, 2010, Alabi was drafted by the Dallas Mavericks with the 50th pick, and traded to the Toronto Raptors for cash considerations.

On July 8, 2010, he signed a contract with the Toronto Raptors. The Raptors assigned him to the Erie BayHawks on November 15, 2010. He was recalled on December 9, 2010, sent back to Erie on January 6, 2011, and recalled once again by the Raptors on January 14, 2011. The Raptors assigned him to the BayHawks for a third time on March 9, 2011.  Afterwards, Alabi was recalled back up to Toronto for a third time on April 5, 2011.

On January 4, 2012, Alabi was assigned to the Bakersfield Jam of the D-League. He was recalled on January 22, 2012. On April 26, 2012, against the New Jersey Nets, Alabi recorded career highs of 11 points, 19 rebounds and 3 blocks in 40 minutes in the final game of the regular season.

On October 1, 2012, Solomon signed with the New Orleans Hornets. However, he was released on October 27.

On December 28, 2012, Alabi joined the Idaho Stampede. He was released on March 1, 2013.

On March 21, 2013, he signed with the Greek first division basketball club Ikaros Kallitheas B.C.

On September 28, 2013, Alabi signed with the Philadelphia 76ers. However, he was waived on October 5. He later signed with the Yulon Dinos of Taiwan for the 2013–14 season.

In January 2015, Alabi signed with the Barako Bull Energy for the 2015 PBA Commissioner's Cup.

NBA career statistics

Regular season 

|-
| align="left" | 
| align="left" | Toronto
| 12 || 0 || 4.9 || .200 || .000 || .000 || 1.2 || .2 || .2 || .2 || .5
|-
| align="left" | 
| align="left" | Toronto
| 14 || 0 || 8.7 || .361 || .000 || .875 || 3.4 || .2 || .1 || .6 || 2.4
|- class="sortbottom"
| style="text-align:center;" colspan="2"| Career
| 26 || 0 || 7.0 || .314 || .000 || .700 || 2.3 || .2 || .2 || .4 || 1.5

References

External links
NBA D-League Profile

1988 births
Living people
Barako Bull Energy players
Bakersfield Jam players
Basketball players from Orlando, Florida
Centers (basketball)
Dallas Mavericks draft picks
Erie BayHawks (2008–2017) players
Florida State Seminoles men's basketball players
Fukushima Firebonds players
Idaho Stampede players
Ikaros B.C. players
Montverde Academy alumni
National Basketball Association players from Nigeria
Nigerian expatriate basketball people in the United States
Philippine Basketball Association imports
Toronto Raptors players
Toyotsu Fighting Eagles Nagoya players
Nigerian expatriate basketball people in Japan
Nigerian expatriate basketball people in the Philippines
Expatriate basketball people in Taiwan
Yulon Luxgen Dinos players
People from Zaria
Super Basketball League imports